Africa Education and Leadership Initiative (Africa ELI) is a non-profit organization based in Knoxville, Tennessee.  It provides funding and resources for adolescents and young adults in South Sudan to complete their secondary school education.  Africa ELI is registered as an international non-governmental organization through the Government of South Sudan (GOSS) Ministry of Legal Affairs.  Operations in South Sudan are based in Yei, a city in the southern part of South Sudan.

Africa ELI's target population is primarily girls, ranging in age from 14 – 24 years old.  This population is at the greatest risk for being undereducated due to the high degree of gender inequality in South Sudan, a country in which cultural and institutional norms marginalize women, and in which adolescent girls are frequently forced into child marriage.  Africa ELI promotes education as necessary for the well-being of individuals, families, and communities; as a pathway for overcoming poverty by preparing young people for sustainable livelihoods; and as a means of effecting positive social change.  Africa ELI sees the empowerment of young women as crucial for the future success of South Sudan.

In addition to funding academics through the provision of scholarships, Africa ELI provides practical skills programs for its students, offering instruction in areas such as good health practices, environmental care, and leadership development.

History 
Africa ELI was conceived in January, 2004 by Robert Lair, a faculty member at Saint Michael's College in Vermont, and Atem Deng, a former Sudanese refugee and student at the University of Vermont.  While traveling from East Africa back to the U.S., the two, having witnessed the lack of education opportunities affecting Sudanese refugees across East Africa, decided that they wanted to make an impact in southern Sudan. The New Sudan Education Initiative (renamed as Africa ELI in 2010) was created the following year after the signing of the Comprehensive Peace Agreement (CPA), which ended the Second Sudanese Civil War and laid the groundwork for South Sudan independence. The CPA created a critical opportunity for development to take place in the region.

The organization received the bulk of its start-up funding from the World Bank and assistance from Winrock International as an implementing partner.

References

Education in South Sudan
Foreign charities operating in South Sudan
Educational charities based in the United States
Charities based in Tennessee
Development charities based in the United States